The 1947 Polish Football Championship was the 21st edition of the Polish Football Championship and 19th completed season ended with the selection of a winner. It was the last edition of the Polish championship played in a non-league formula, since 1948 the champion of the country was chosen in the league. The champions were Warta Poznań, who won their 2nd Polish title.

Competition modus
The championship was decided in a series of tournaments. The tournaments started on 30 March 1947 and concluded on 30 November 1947 (spring-autumn system). 28 teams was divided into 3 groups. In each of groups the season was played as a round-robin tournament. A total of 28 teams participated. Each team played a total of matches, half at home and half away, two games against each other team. Teams received two points for a win and one point for a draw. The winners of each group played a Final Group tournament for the title.

Final tournament tables

Group 1

Group 2

Group 3

Final Group

Top goalscorers

References

Bibliography

External links
 Poland – List of final tables at RSSSF 
 List of Polish football championships 
 List of Polish football championships 

1
Polish
Polish
Seasons in Polish football competitions